In enzymology, a neoxanthin synthase is an enzyme that catalyzes the chemical reaction:

violaxanthin  neoxanthin

Hence, this enzyme has one substrate, violaxanthin, and one product, neoxanthin.

This enzyme belongs to the family of isomerases, specifically a class of other intramolecular oxidoreductases.  The systematic name of this enzyme class is violaxanthin---neoxanthin isomerase (epoxide-opening). This enzyme is also called NSY.  This enzyme participates in carotenoid biosynthesis - general.

References

 
 

EC 5.3.99
Enzymes of unknown structure